Helen Elizabeth Ogilvie (4 May 1902, in Corowa – 1 August 1993, in Melbourne) was a twentieth-century Australian artist and gallery director, cartoonist, painter, printmaker and craftworker, best known for her early linocuts and woodcuts, and her later oil paintings of vernacular colonial buildings.

Early life and education 
Helen Elizabeth Ogilvie was born 4 May 1902 in Corowa and grew up in surrounding rural New South Wales where she would go sketching with her mother, Henrietta, a watercolourist, before her family moved to Melbourne in 1920. There Helen attended the National Gallery School in 1922–25 though she did not enjoy its conservative approach and prescriptive teaching methods. In her last year her style was influenced by George Bell while he briefly was the drawing master. While at the school she became a member of the Melbourne Society of Women Painters and Sculptors and started exhibiting in 1924.

Early career 
Inspired by seeing a book of Claude Flight's Modernist linocuts in 1928,  Ogilvie produced many linocuts and woodcuts from the 1930s onwards. Her work in a 1932 group show is praised, with that of other exhibitors, for skills in cutting and "an intimate artistic facility for illustrative design". She was one of many women artists who took up relief printing but, unlike Eveline Syme and Ethel Spowers, Ogilvie could not afford to study it overseas, and when she took up wood engraving in the 1930s it was her friend, the artist and printmaker Eric Thake who provided instruction.  She focussed on subject matter familiar to her, including farm animals, rural landscapes and Australian flora and fauna. Curator Sheridan Palmer in the catalogue for a 1995 Art Gallery of Ballarat retrospective described her as;

She exhibited frequently, but in an effort to survive in the Depression years she also produced bookplates, greeting cards, and calendars. In 1933 she showed in a joint exhibition with printmaker Anne Montgomery.

She enjoyed good connections at Melbourne University and the National Gallery of Victoria, with art historians Joseph Burke, Ursula Hoff, and with Russell Grimwade, producing illustrations for the latter's book Flinders Lane: recollections of Alfred Felton (Melbourne University Press,Carlton, 1947) and Sir John Medley's Stolne and surreptitious verses (Melbourne University Press, Carlton, 1952). Buttons bearing her designs were sold for a shilling to raise funds for the 1955 building program at Melbourne University.

War years 
During WW2 and after, Ogilvie worked in the Red Cross Rehabilitation Service at Heidelberg Military Hospital under Frances Wade, where she taught patients lino- and wood-cutting, and basketmaking using locally harvested European and Australian native rushes. In 1948 Ogilvie, assisted by Helen Biggs, set up a school to train handicrafts instructors for Red Cross occupational therapy services.

Gallerist 
Ogilvie was a generous mentor of emerging artists, and in 1949 Stanley Coe appointed her as one of Australia's first women gallery directors to create a commercial exhibition space on the upper floor of his interior design shop at 435 Bourke Street, Melbourne. Artist Tate Adams dubbed it "the lone beacon in town for contemporary art." For the period until 1955, and with advice from her friends Ursula Hoff, Arnold Shore and Alan McCulloch, she organised a program of exhibitions of the avant-garde; John Brack, Margo Lewers, Leonard French (who showed his Illiad series, amongst his earliest experiments with enamel house paint on Masonite, October 1952), Inge King, Arthur Boyd, Charles Blackman (whose radical 'schoolgirl' series was shown there in May 1953), Ludwig Hirschfeld Mack (whose first Australian show in a commercial gallery was there in 1953), Helen Maudsley, Clifton Pugh, Michael Shannon and others.

The opening show in February 1950 of a group twenty Victorian artists associated with George Bell, whose work was also shown, included Alan Warren, Alan Sumner, Constance Stokes, Roger Kemp, William Frater, Charles Bush, Daryl Lindsay, Phyl Waterhouse, Ada May Plante, Francis Roy Thompson, and Arnold Shore, and was followed by a survey show of contemporary art from Sydney. The National Gallery of Victoria purchased important contemporary works from Stanley Coe Gallery between 1950 and 1963. In 1954 however, the dominance of the gallery for emerging artists was being challenged, a fact signalled by the Contemporary Art Society's massive exhibition at Tye's Gallery at 100 Burke Street in 1954 and the ascendancy of their Gallery of Contemporary Art on Flinders Street.

During her period as gallery director, work by Ogilvie was among others selected in 1950 to decorate the liner Oronsay, and in 1954 her work was show together with that of Tate Adams and Kenneth Hood at the Victoria and Albert Museum, London, encouraging her change of attention to Europe and back to her own art-making.

London 
After moving on from her directorship, Ogilvie's own oil paintings of abandoned country structures were shown in 1956 at the gallery, which had been renamed the Peter Bray. She  had firmly established her reputation in Australia, with works already acquired by Hoff for the collection of the National Gallery of Victoria, and had purchased a house in South Yarra. That year she moved to London, where she was engaged with the Crafts Revival of the 1950s and 60s and because, as she joked in an interview, "art doesn't pay", she made a living designing modernist lampshades of Japanese papers and parchment for a period, selling them to the high society customers of interior designer David Hicks, of Knightsbridge and Oxfordshire.

During her stay overseas, she visited and sketched the English countryside, and with Melbourne friend Hattie Alexander, described as her 'companion', toured Italy over 11 weeks. Though she produced sketches of European sites, she did not exhibit them but continued to paint small studies of Australian rural buildings, from memory and from sketches, holding two successful solo exhibitions of them in London, including one of 34 canvases, which sold out.

Return to Australia and late career 
Ogilvie returned to Australia in 1963 where the subjects of her paintings and drawings continued to be humble rural buildings which she was aware were disappearing; in an interview she bemoaned the lack of protection given such relics in Australia, compared to the UK. While many Australian artists continued to follow European and international trends, Ogilvie devoted her art to Australian subjects, determined to create a new tradition of Australian printmaking and artistic practice. Reception of her paintings in Australia however, as opposed to her earlier prints, was lukewarm; Donald Brook in reviewing her 1968 Macquarie Galleries solo describes them as 'sweet and stiff'. By the late 1970s she was producing little work but remained interested in the art world. The last of her solo exhibitions that she was able to attend opened at aGOG (Australian Girls' Own Gallery), Canberra, on her 89th birthday, 4 May 1991.

Ogilvie died suddenly in Melbourne on 1 August 1993.

Legacy 
Critical response to Ogilvie's work was sparse, limited mainly to the prints and to vague praise or her 'fine impressions in line and colour' or of lino-cutting skills, 'the work of a sound craftsman [sic]', 'decorative' and with a sense of colour that is 'agreeable and harmonious'. By the time of curator Sheridan Palmer's touring Ballarat Art Gallery Ogilvie 1995 retrospective, The Age critic Robert Nelson in his review highlighted;

Nevertheless, her work, especially her printmaking, has since enjoyed a renewed interest and reevaluation, and has featured in seven major surveys of Australian women's art (see section 'Posthumous exhibitions', below).

Exhibitions

Solo 
 1948, May: Exhibition of watercolour drawings
 1956, April: Paintings, Peter Bray Gallery, Melbourne
 1963, February/March: Australian Country Dwellings, shown with The Landscapes of Lucien Pissarro at Leicester Galleries Gallery, Audley Sq., Mayfair, London
 1967, March: Leicester Galleries, Audley Sq., Mayfair, London
 1968, September: joint solo with David Rose, Macquarie Galleries, Sydney
 1968, October: Helen Ogilvie Paintings, Leveson Street Gallery, North Melbourne
 1972, from 3 May: Macquarie Galleries (joint solo with Nancy Borlase)
 1974, 2–13 June: Leveson Street Gallery, Melbourne.
 1979, 11–30 July: solo alongside Trevor Weekes and Denese Oates, Macquarie Galleries
 1982, 1 October – 31 October: Project 39: Women's imprint, part of Women and the Arts Festival, Art Gallery of New South Wales, Sydney, New South Wales
 1991, May 1991: australian Girls Own Gallery, Canberra, ACT

Group 
1924, 18–27 November: An Exhibition Of Etchings & Drawings, with Hans Heysen, John D. Moor, Lionel Lindsay, John Goodchild, John L. Berry, Frank H. Molony,  R. J. Waterhouse, Fred. C. Brltten, Lloyd Rees, d’A. Boxall, J. Barclay Godson, Arthur Reed, H. Van Raake, B. E. Minns, Harold D. Herbert, James S. MacDonald, Norman Carter, Thea Proctor, Alfred T. Clint, Margaret Preston, A. Henry Fullwood, Raymond H. McGrath, Don Finley, Hamilton Mack, Adrian Feint, F. M. Grey, Montague White, Audrey Hardy, K. Sauerbier, Professor Leslie Wilkinson, Hardy Wilson, Daryl Lindsay, Sydney Ure Smith.   Exhibition Hall, Sixth Floor, Farmer & Company, department store, cnr. Pitt, Market & George Streets, Sydney
 1932, 5–16 April: with Sybil Andrews, Cyril Power, Ethel Spowers, Eveline Syme,  Eric Thake, John Dick, Christian Waller, Dorrit Block, Ron Meadows, Marjorie Wood, Michael O’Connell. Everyman's Library, 332 Collins Street
 1932, to 29 October: Helen Ogilvie, Peggie Crombie, Helen Boyd, paintings and prints. Collins House, Melbourne.
 1933: New Melbourne Art Club exhibition, Sedon Galleries, Melbourne 
 1933, 16–23 October: The Arts and Crafts Society Annual Exhibition, Melbourne Town Hall
 1934, The centenary art exhibition, Commonwealth Bank Chambers, 367 Collins Street, Melbourne.
 1936: Painter-Etchers and Graphic Art Society of Australia, David Jones Art Gallery
 1936, 14–25 July: New Melbourne Art Club exhibition, Athenaeum Gallery
 1936, 15 April-1 May: Exhibition of paintings, Stair Gallery, 117 Collins Street, Melbourne
 1937, from 12 July: New Melbourne Art Club exhibition, Athenaeum Gallery
 1939, 21 August – 2 September: New Melbourne Art Club Seventh Annual Show
 1949, February 22-March 4: Exhibition of pictures by Australian artists and loan collection of Indian art, in aid of University Women's College Building Appeal,. Tye's Gallery, 100 Bourke Street, Melbourne
 1949, 5 – 13 November: Fern Tree Gully Arts Society, Sixth annual exhibition.
 1953, October: Flowerdale CWA annual exhibition
 1954, November: Helen Ogilvie, Tate Adams, Kenneth Hood, Victoria and Albert Museum, London
 1954: with Braund, Blackman, Brack, Shannon, Nine Victorian Artists, Peter Bay Gallery.
 1956, June: with Dorothy Braund, Barbara Brash, Guelda Pyke, Roma Thomson, Phyl Waterhouse, and six male artists, Paintings for Seven Guineas, Peter Bray Gallery
 1958: Crouch Prize exhibition, Art Gallery of Ballarat
 1964, August: with Lady Williams (President) Geoff Jones, Guelda Pyke, Edith Wall, Bill Coleman, Dorothy Braund, Guelda Gude, Madge Freeman Davis, and others of the Melbourne Contemporary Artists, Argus Gallery
 1965, 28 February-11 March: Leveson Street Art Gallery, corner of Leveson and Victoria Streets, North Melbourne
 1967, 26 February-9 March: Leveson Street Art Gallery, corner of Leveson and Victoria Streets, North Melbourne
 1973, March: Leveson Street Art Gallery, corner of Leveson and Victoria Streets, North Melbourne
 1974, March 3–21: Leveson Street Art Gallery, corner of Leveson and Victoria Streets, North Melbourne
 1974, 26 September: Association for the Blind – Springfield Art Show
 1975, 7 November-23 November: Deutsher Galleries opening exhibition – a collection of 19th & 20th century European & Australian paintings, drawings & graphics
 1977, April 2: Exhibition marking the opening of 'Important Women Artists Gallery', 13 Emo Road, Malvern East, Victoria
 1978, 1 April-7 May: Cicadas and gumnuts – The Society of Arts and Crafts 1906–1935, Art Gallery of New South Wales
 1979, 16 February-4 March: inaugural exhibition Murray Crescent Galleries, 35 Murray Crescent, Manuka, Australian Capital Territory
 1980, 21–23 November: Ogilvie works included amongst 600 items purchased for the National Gallery of Victoria by the Gallery Society from 1949–1980 which were offered for sale at an Art Mart, Caulfield Arts Centre.
 1981/2, Nov. 1981 – Jan. 1982: with Christopher Croft, Janet Dawson, Ruth Faerber, Dusan Marek, Clifton Pugh, Lloyd Rees, Udo Sellbach, Michael Shannon, Guy Warren. Tasmania visited, Tasmanian Museum and Art Gallery.
 1982, 27 November-5 December: Artbank purchase exhibition held in conjunction with the Victorian Artists' Society
 1990, 9–24 December: Christmas exhibition, Jester Press Gallery, 178 Bridport Street, Albert Park

Posthumous

Solo 
 1995: All this I knew, Ballarat Fine Art Gallery, Ballarat, VIC. and travelling
 1995/6, 15 December – 14 January: Helen Ogilvie Retrospective, McClelland Art Gallery, Langwarrin

Inclusions in 
 1995, 5 March – 30 April: Australian Women Printmakers 1910–1940, Castlemaine Art Museum, Castlemaine, VIC
 1995, 8 March – 2 April: The Women's View: Australian women artists in the Bendigo Art Gallery, 1888–1995, Bendigo Art Gallery, Bendigo, Vic
 1995, 8 March – 8 June: National Women's Art Exhibition, with Speaking of Women, four guest lectures; by Nancy Underhill, Ann Thomson, Margo Neale, Joan Kerr; held over successive Fridays, 10–31 March 1995, by the Art Gallery Society, Art Gallery of New South Wales, Sydney, NSW
 1995, 4 August – 5 August: Women and Art auction preview for Dalia Stanley Auctioneers, auction held 6 August 1995, Mary Place Gallery, Paddington, NSW
 2000/1, 24 November 2000 – 25 February 2001: Modern Australian Women: paintings and prints 1925–1945, Art Gallery of South Australia, Adelaide, SA. Then national tour.
 2002, June/July: Journeys, Tasmanian Museum and Art Gallery
 2011/12 10 December 2011 to 4 February 2012: Australian works on paper, Josef Lebovic Gallery, Kensington
 2011/12, 20 October 2011 – 15 December 2012: Look, Look Again, highlights from the Cruthers Collection of Women's Art (CCWA),  gifted to the University of Western Australia in 2007, with publication titled Into the Light and symposium Are we there yet?. Lawrence Wilson Art Gallery, University of Western Australia, Perth, WA
 2019, 18 May – 4 August: Becoming Modern : Australian women artists 1920–1950, Art Gallery of Ballarat

Collections 
 Art Gallery of Western Australia, Perth, WA
 Queen Victoria Museum and Art Gallery, Launceston, TAS
 Tasmanian Museum and Art Gallery, Hobart, TAS
 Castlemaine Art Museum, Castlemaine, VIC
 Benalla Art Gallery, Benalla, VIC
 City of Ballarat Fine Art Gallery, Ballarat, VIC
 University of Melbourne, Melbourne, VIC
 La Trobe Collection, State Library of Victoria, Melbourne, VIC
 National Gallery of Victoria, Melbourne, VIC
 National Gallery of Australia, Canberra, ACT
 Art Gallery of New South Wales, Sydney, NSW, Australia
 Queensland Art Gallery
 Ian Potter Museum of Art, the University of Melbourne, VIC
 Cruthers Collection of Women's Art at the University of Western Australia

Publications illustrated by

Publications about

References 

1902 births
1993 deaths
20th-century Australian women artists
20th-century Australian LGBT people
Australian printmakers
Australian cartoonists
Australian LGBT artists
Australian art curators
Australian art gallery directors
Artists from New South Wales
National Gallery of Victoria Art School alumni